Stepanov (Степанов), female Stepanova is a common Russian and Serbian surname that is derived from the male given name Stepan and literally means Stepan's. Notable people with the surname include:

Aleksandr Stepanov (disambiguation), several people
Alexandra Stepanova (born 1995), Russian ice dancer
Aleksandra Stepanova (handballer) (born 1989), Russian handball player
Aleksei Stepanov (born 1977), Russian association football player
Alexander Stepanov, designer of the C++ Standard Template Library
Alexei Stepanov (1858–1923), Russian painter
Andrei Stepanov (footballer) (born 1979), Estonian association football player
Galina Stepanova (rower) (born 1958), Russian Olympic rower
Galina Stepanova-Prozumenshchykova (1948–2015), Russian swimmer
Georgy Stepanov (1890-1953), Soviet naval officer
Igors Stepanovs, Latvian association football player
Ilona Štěpánová-Kurzová (1899–1975), Czech pianist and professor
Inna Stepanova (born 1990), Russian archer
Konstantin Stepanov (1922–1999), Soviet army officer and Hero of the Soviet Union
Maria Stepanova (born 1979), Russian basketball player
Marina Stepanova (born 1950), Russian hurdler
Milan Stepanov, Serbian association football player
Nadezhda Stepanova (born 1959), Russian long-distance runner
Oleg Stepanov (judoka), Soviet judoka
Onufriy Stepanov, an explorer of the Russian Far East
Sergei Stepanov (disambiguation), several people
Tatiana Stepanova (born 1962), Ukrainian ballet expert
Tatiana Stepanova (ballerina), Ukrainian ballerina
Varvara Stepanova (1894–1958), Russian avant-garde artist
Vasilijs Stepanovs, Latvian weightlifter
Vasiliy Stepanov (disambiguation), multiple people
Veronika Stepanova (born 2001), Russian cross-country skier
Vladimir Ivanovich Stepanov, Russian dancer
Vladimir Stepanov (disambiguation), multiple people
Vyacheslav Stepanov, Russian mathematician
Yuliya Stepanova (born 1962), Russian cross-country skier
Yuliya Stepanova (born 1986), Russian athlete

Fictional characters
Stepan Stepanov, or Uncle Styopa

Russian-language surnames
Serbian surnames
Surnames from given names